The 1979 Victorian state election, held on Saturday, 5 May 1979, was for the 48th Parliament of Victoria. It was held in the Australian state of Victoria to elect 81 members of the state's Legislative Assembly and 22 members of the 44-member Legislative Council.

The incumbent Liberal government led by Rupert Hamer was returned with a significantly reduced majority.

Results

Legislative Assembly

|}

Legislative Council 

|}

Seats changing hands

 Members listed in italics did not recontest their seats.
 In addition, Labor retained the seat of Greensborough, which it had won from the Liberals in a by-election.

Post-election pendulum

See also
Candidates of the 1979 Victorian state election

References

1979 elections in Australia
Elections in Victoria (Australia)
1970s in Victoria (Australia)
May 1979 events in Australia